Safe Haven for Donkeys in the Holy Land (SHADH) is a British registered charity that cares for working and abandoned donkeys in Israel and the Palestinian Territories.

The organization, which was set up in 2000, runs a  donkey sanctuary near the Israeli town of Netanya. At the beginning of 2017, Safe Haven was home to more than 230 donkeys.

Safe Haven also runs a programme of free veterinary clinics for working donkeys, mules and horses in the Palestinian Territories.  The team regularly visits towns and villages where they offer free veterinary care, advice on tooth and hoof care, harnessing and education and support for the owners.

In 2012 the charity opened a permanent clinic in the Palestinian city of Nablus, open 7 days a week and is treating around 200 working donkeys, mules and horses every week.

The charity's Royal Patron is HRH Princess Alexandra the Hon Lady Ogilvy KG GCVO.  Patrons are the Rt Hon the Earl of Stockton, actor Peter Egan, journalist and broadcaster Kay Burley, broadcaster Des Lynam, actor Anthony Head, author and journalist Julie Burchill and former MP and author Ann Widdecombe.

See also 
 Animal welfare and rights in Israel
 Brooke Hospital for Animals
 The Donkey Sanctuary

References

External links
 Official website
 BBC article on Ann Widdecombe's involvement
Telegraph: Donkey rescue in the Middle East
YouTube: Sanctuary in the Holy Land gives comfort to hard working donkeys

Charities based in Israel
Palestinian charities
Animal charities based in the United Kingdom